Anita Baranting is a Malaysian politician who served as the State Minister of Community Development and Consumer Affairs. He served as the Member of Sabah State Legislative Assembly (MLA) for Tandek from March 2008 until September 2020. She is a member of the Homeland Solidarity Party (STAR) which is aligned with the ruling Perikatan Nasional (PN) coalition both in federal and state levels.

Election results

Honours 
  :
  Commander of the Order of Kinabalu (PGDK) - Datuk (2014)

References

Members of the Sabah State Legislative Assembly
Homeland Solidarity Party politicians
Living people
Year of birth missing (living people)